Der Winzerkönig   is an Austrian television series.

See also
List of Austrian television series

External links
 

Austrian television series
2006 Austrian television series debuts
2010 Austrian television series endings
2000s Austrian television series
2010s Austrian television series
German-language television shows
Television series about wine
ORF (broadcaster)